Vijay Singh Deol (born 27 January 1969), known by his stage name Bobby Deol, is an Indian actor who works in Bollywood. A member of the Deol family, he is the younger son of actor Dharmendra. He has won a Filmfare Award in 1996.

After appearing as a child artist in Dharam Veer (1977), Deol had his first lead role in the blockbuster romance Barsaat (1995) that won him the Filmfare Award for Best Male Debut. He established himself as a lead with the top-grossing films Gupt (1997), Soldier (1998), Badal (2000), Bichhoo (2000), Ajnabee (2001), and Humraaz (2002). It was followed by a brief career downturn, during which his only rarely successful films include multi starrers like Apne (2007), Yamla Pagla Deewana (2011), Race 3 (2018) and Housefull 4 (2019). He reinforced his critical success with acclaimed performances in digital ventures Class of '83 (2020), Love Hostel (2022) and Aashram (2020–present).

Early life and family 

Deol was born on 27 January 1969 into a Punjabi Jat family in Bombay. He is the second son of Bollywood star Dharmendra and Parkash Kaur. He is the younger brother of Sunny Deol and also has two sisters Vijayta and Ajeeta who live in California. His step-mother is Hema Malini, through whom he has two paternal half-sisters, actress Esha Deol and Ahana Deol. His cousin Abhay Deol is also an actor.

Acting career

1995–2003 
Deol first briefly appeared as a child actor at the age of ten in Dharam Veer (1977). Deol then made his adult debut in Bollywood alongside Twinkle Khanna in Barsaat (1995) directed by Rajkumar Santoshi. Deol plays the character of Badal, a naive but intelligent young man who moves from a small village to the big city and gets caught up with corrupt police and criminal gangs amidst falling in love. Partly shot in Scotland, Deol broke his leg in an equestrian accident while filming and had to be flown to London to recuperate and had to call off several publicity shoots which documented his debut. The film was a moderate success at the box office and garnered him the Filmfare Award for Best Male Debut.

In 1997, Deol starred in Gupt: The Hidden Truth, a suspense thriller directed by Rajiv Rai, which is widely considered his breakthrough role. Cast alongside Manisha Koirala, Kajol, Paresh Rawal, Om Puri and Raj Babbar, Deol played the role of Sahil, a young man accused of murdering his stepfather over an engagement proposal and wrongly imprisoned. He escapes and tracks down the real killer. Gupt: The Hidden Truth was highly acclaimed for its storyline and soundtrack and was a commercial success. In the same year, Deol appeared in Aur Pyaar Ho Gaya, alongside Aishwarya Rai in her debut Bollywood role. The film failed to do well at the box office.

In 1998, Deol starred opposite Neha in the Vidhu Vinod Chopra film, Kareeb. Deol played the character of Birju, an irresponsible young man from an upper-middle-class family in Himachal Pradesh with a love of petty thievery and deceit. Later in 1998, he appeared in Abbas Mustan's military thriller Soldier, alongside Raakhee and Preity Zinta. Deol played the mysterious character of Vicky, later revealed as Raju, son of Vijay Malhotra who was convicted of arms smuggling. Soldier was a big hit and was a huge commercial success.

In 1999, Deol starred in Dillagi, directed by and co-starring his brother Sunny Deol. The film is noted for being the first time Sunny Deol directed a film and also the first time he acted alongside Bobby Deol. This pairing was repeated in 23rd March 1931: Shaheed (2002), Apne (2007) and Yamla Pagla Deewana (2011) among others. Dillagi features the two as the brothers Ranvir and Rajvir, fighting for the affection of Shalini (Urmila Matondkar).

In 2000, Deol appeared in the action drama Badal alongside Rani Mukerji, under the director's helm of Raj Kanwar. The film is set in 1984 when riots were engulfing parts of Punjab and Delhi. Deol plays the character of Badal, a boy who witnesses the massacre of his family and villagers by the corrupt Police Inspector Jai Singh Rana (Ashutosh Rana) and grows up to be a dreaded terrorist, fuelled by the anger and hatred of the authorities who wrongly deprived him of his family and friends. The film is inspired by The Devil's Own (1997), starring Brad Pitt and Harrison Ford. Badal was a commercial success. Following this, he starred alongside Karisma Kapoor in Hum To Mohabbat Karega (2000), and reunited with Rani Mukerji in Bichhoo (2000), a blatant remake of Luc Besson's 1994 film Leon, starring Jean Reno and Natalie Portman. In Bichhoo, Deol plays Reno's role, Jeeva, a young man from a struggling middle-class family who has the misfortune of falling in love with the wealthy Kiran (Malaika Arora). Her cruel, disapproving father in rage at their relationship, has Jeeva's mother and two sisters publicly arrested for prostitution, and eventually all three kill themselves. Jeeva becomes a professional killer and later exacts vengeance against Kiran's father and his henchmen. He and his neighbour Kiran Bali (Mukerji) soon witness the entire Bali family get murdered. Jeeva now decides to help Kiran seek revenge on the men who killed her family. The film and Deol's performance was panned by the critics, with Sakanya Verna of Rediff.com citing the film as "one of the most painful of the year" and commenting, "Deol's performance is quite, well, robotic. He religiously hangs on to a brooding expression right through the film. Why-o-why doesn't someone insist he goes to an acting school?"

In 2001 (although filmed in 2000), Deol starred alongside Karisma Kapoor and Rahul Dev in Indra Kumar's Aashiq. Following this, he featured in Abbas–Mustan's thriller, Ajnabee, alongside Kareena Kapoor, Akshay Kumar and Bipasha Basu. The film, adapted from the 1992 American thriller Consenting Adults, features Bobby as Raj, the new husband of Priya Malhotra (Kapoor) who after moving to Switzerland and initially befriending their neighbors (Kumar and Basu), become entangled in a web of deceit and extra-marital affairs. Ziya us Salaam of The Hindu was unconvinced with Deol's performance, remarking that he "only occasionally manages to transmit fear of the fugitive."

In 2002, Deol starred alongside his brother Sunny in the historical drama 23rd March 1931: Shaheed. Set in British India, it depicts the events leading up to the hanging of Indian freedom fighter Bhagat Singh and his companions Rajguru and Sukhdev on 23 March 1931. The film stars Bobby Deol as Bhagat Singh and Sunny Deol as another revolutionary Chandra Shekhar Azad. The film received mixed reviews from critics. Rediff.com believed the movie had plenty of good moments, and plenty of bad ones and believed the film was superior to that of the original on Bhagat Singh, although they believed the agony of Bhagat Singh's fight was underplayed, diminishing the brutality and anguish suffered in the real-life event. While Deol was praised for some scenes, he was criticised for his loud acting and Rediff.com believed he was overshadowed by Ajay Devgan remarking, "In terms of performance, Devgan is clearly the winner, with the advantage of a stronger script and a better director. Devgan, who reportedly lost weight to look the part, is today emerging as one of India's finest actors, willing to try out different roles. Deol tries his best, but it is difficult to shout and act simultaneously."

Later in 2002, Deol was nominated for Filmfare Award for Best Actor for his role as a suave, wealthy shipping businessman in Abbas-Mustan's romantic thriller Humraaz. The film is inspired by Alfred Hitchcock's Dial M For Murder (1954) (remade in 1998 as A Perfect Murder) and features Deol in a love triangle with Ameesha Patel and Akshaye Khanna. The film received positive reviews from critics, with Chitra Mahesh of The Hindu saying, "Bobby Deol spends the entire first half looking moony eyed and spaced out, but overcomes the stupor towards the end where he actually gives a good performance." Deol's final film of 2002 was David Dhawan's Chor Machaaye Shor in which he acted alongside Paresh Rawal, Shilpa Shetty, Bipasha Basu and Om Puri. He played Shyam, a small-time crook who gets his hands on some diamonds worth millions.

2004–2013 
In 2003, Deol took a hiatus from acting and returned to the screen in 2004 in Kismat opposite Priyanka Chopra. In Bardaasht, a drama based on the screenplay written by Vikram Bhatt, Deol starred alongside Lara Dutta and Rahul Dev as Aditya Shrivastav, a deserted army officer. The film deals with themes of police brutality and corruption and justice. Deol then played another army officer, a Lieutenant Commander in Anil Sharma's Ab Tumhare Hawale Watan Saathiyo as Kunaljit Singh/Vikramjeet Singh. The film, which featured an ensemble cast including Amitabh Bachchan and Akshay Kumar, was arguably Deol's most high-profile film to date, but despite the hype and high box office expectations, it proved a commercial disaster. However, he received praise for his role which had him wear a pugh/turban, which gave him more of an audience from the Punjabi crowd, and inspired comments saying he looks better in a turban.

In 2005, Deol starred in Vikram Bhatt's thriller Jurm as the wealthy businessman Avinash Malhotra who suspects his wife Sanjana (Lara Dutta) of having an affair with Rohit (Milind Soman). Deol's performance was praised by a number of critics, with Vivek Fernandes of Rediff.com remarking, "Bobby Deol, Bhatt's schoolmate, does his alma mater proud with his controlled performance. There's a sense of maturity about his candour, which is good news." Deol then starred alongside Sanjay Dutt, Sunil Shetty and Ajay Devgan in Mani Shankar's war movie Tango Charlie as an Indian trooper named Tarun Chauhan of the 101st BSF Battalion, operating in the northeastern Indian province fighting Bodo militants in Upper Assam. He followed this role by featuring in Suneel Darshan's romance film Barsaat as the ambitious young Indian Arav, who, in living in the United States, becomes involved in a love triangle with Priyanka Chopra and Bipasha Basu. The film was a critical and commercial failure, with Ziya us Salaam of The Hindu concluding, "A moth-eaten love triangle with all the stereotypes Bollywood survives on – a devoted wife with her karva chauth ki thali, the other woman with her mini-skirts, a joint family, songs, festivities..... No shower of rejuvenation, this Barsaat is just drenched in mediocrity." She was equally unimpressed with Deol's performance, remarking, "The girls are ready with their curls and curves, the guy just appears lost, making you wonder if Bobby has grown even an inch as an actor since he made his debut in Rajkumar Santoshi's film of the same name." His final role of 2005 was as Karan in Dosti: Friends Forever, opposite Akshay Kumar, Lara Dutta, Kareena Kapoor, and Juhi Chawla. He once again plays a wealthy businessman but is down on his luck with his finances and romancing women. The film, although performing below average in India was a major success in the United Kingdom, where it became the highest grosser of Bollywood in 2005, grossing around £888,000.

In 2006, Deol starred in the romantic musical film Humko Tumse Pyaar Hai. Deol played Raj, a character who falls in love with Durga (Ameesha Patel), a beautiful blind woman with a talent for shaping pottery, but faces competition from Rohit (Arjun Rampal). The pairing of Deol and Patel was hugely hyped and had been labelled as the "Bollywood equivalent of Hugh Grant and Renée Zellweger". Although the film received mixed reviews, a number of critics praised Deol's performance as Raj, with Taran Adarsh commenting, "Bobby Deol is only getting better as an actor. He manages to register an impact in a film that belongs to Patel and Rampal primarily." Later that year, he made a brief special appearance in Alag in the song Sabse Alag.

In 2007, Deol starred in 6 films. The first of them, Shakalaka Boom Boom, was shot in South Africa and is based on conflicts and the power game involved in the functioning of the music industry, addressing the themes of envy, jealousy, insecurity, anxiety, manipulation and anger. The film, which featured Deol alongside Upen Patel, Kangana Ranaut and Celina Jaitly was generally praised by critics, especially for its choreography, and Deol received some positive reviews. Taran Adarsh of IndiaFM.com said after viewing the film, "Both Bobby and Upen get fabulous roles and the two actors make the most of it. Bobby is one of the most under-rated actors around. His work has been consistent all through, but one tends to overlook this talented actor's abilities all the while. Watch him go negative in Shakalaka Boom Boom and you'd agree that he's amongst the best in the business today. His outburst in the end is remarkable."

Deol's second film of 2007 was Jhoom Barabar Jhoom, which saw him play the character of Steve/Satvinder Singh opposite Abhishek Bachchan (who played a gypsy in London), Preity Zinta, and Lara Dutta. Directed by Shaad Ali, the film was produced by Aditya Chopra and Yash Chopra under the Yash Raj Films banner. The film opened to mixed reviews, and was mostly criticized by what critics believed was a "shallow screenplay". Taran Adarsh of IndiaFM.com gave the film a 1.5 out of 5 rating, saying, "the film is all gloss, no substance". He also believed that Deol was overshadowed by his co-stars, remarking that the film, "belongs to Abhishek first and Preity next". Deol next starred in the boxing drama Apne. The film was a family affair, featuring Deol alongside his father Dharmendra, a disgraced retired boxer who trains Deol and his brother (Sunny Deol) to become champion boxers but in doing so creates a rift within the family.

Deol next starred in the suspense thriller Naqaab, another Abbas-Mustan film which features him alongside Akshaye Khanna and Urvashi Sharma as another millionaire caught in a love triangle. Deol received mixed reviews for his performance. For instance, Raja Sen of Rediff.com praised several of his scenes, remarking, "Bobby gets a considerably meaty role, and there are a couple of moments when he genuinely works the audience", but describes his character as "sensitive to an annoying hilt". This film was followed by brief special appearances as himself in Om Shanti Om and Nanhe Jaisalmer.

In 2008, Deol starred opposite Priyanka Chopra, Danny Denzongpa and Irrfan Khan in the crime drama Chamku, playing the lead character and titlesake of Chamku, a man raised by Baba (Danny Denzongpa), a Naxal leader based in the southern interiors of Bihar, after his family was brutally murdered. He is assigned by a covert governmental program jointly conceived by RAW and the Intelligence Bureau to carry out political assassinations but after falling in love with the kindergarten teacher Shubhi (Priyanka Chopra), he decides to lead a reformed life but is later tempted to turn to crime again. Kabeer Kaushik, the director of the film had originally approached Deol to play the lead role in his debut film, Sehar, but despite liking the script, Deol turned it down because at the time he was not prepared to work with a debutant director. Deol next featured in Heroes as an army officer and Dhananjay "DJ" Shergill alongside a strong cast which included Salman Khan, Preity Zinta, Sunny Deol and Mithun Chakraborty. Although initially set to be released on 6 June 2008, it was pushed to 24 October 2008, the opening weekend of the holiday Diwali. Much of the filming took place in northern India, including Ladakh (notably Pangong Tso), Chandigarh, Punjab, and Delhi. Deol's last role in 2008 was in the film Dostana, as Abhimanyu Singh, a supporting role to the films' main stars Abhishek Bachchan, John Abraham and Priyanka Chopra under the Dharma Productions banner. The film explores the story of two men who pretend to be gay, but both fall in love with the same girl, their roommate. Dostana is the first Bollywood film to be filmed entirely in Miami, United States and went on to become the eighth highest-grossing film at the Indian box office in 2008.

In 2009, Deol portrayed Nandu, an orphan turned assassin wrongly accused of a politician's murder in the movie Ek: The Power of One.

Deol's next film titled, Help, was shot in Mauritius, in which he appeared opposite Mugdha Godse. The film was released on 13 August 2010. Deol then starred in Yamla Pagla Deewana which was released on 14 January 2011. He later starred in the film Thank You opposite Sonam Kapoor. His character is a businessman who is unfaithful to his wife. In 2012, he appeared in the heist film Players. He played the role of Ronnie, who has no experience in conning people, but is a master of illusions. He was one of the most popular illusionists who abandoned magic after a tragic incident.

2017–present 
Bobby Deol has made his comeback in 2017 with Shreyas Talpade's directorial venture Poster Boys alongside his brother Sunny Deol. In 2018, Deol played the role of Yash in the action thriller Race 3 alongside Salman Khan and Jacqueline Fernandez. He also starred as Kalaa in the comedy film Yamla Pagla Deewana: Phir Se co-starring his Dharmendra, Sunny Deol and Kriti Kharbanda. In 2019, he starred as Dharamputra / Max in the comedy film Housefull 4 alongside Kriti Kharbanda, the film released on 25 October 2019 and was directed by Farhad Samji. His latest release Class of '83 was on Netflix, where he played the character of a police officer. The film is based on the book The Class of '83 and tells the story of a hero policeman shunted to a punishment posting as the dean of the police academy. Class of '83 is Netflix's third collaboration with Red Chillies Entertainment, following the original series Bard of Blood and Betaal. The film premiered on 21 August 2020 on Netflix. In 2020 his web series Aashram premiered on MX Player original series where he played the character of a Baba Nirala. The actor has made a stellar comeback in his second innings and cast in several movies since then. Three generations of Deols in ‘Apne 2’: Dharmendra, Sunny Deol, Bobby Deol, and Karan Deol all set for the sequel.

Filmography

Films

Television

Awards and nominations

References

External links 

 
 
 

Living people
1967 births
Indian male child actors
Male actors in Hindi cinema
20th-century Indian male actors
Punjabi people
Mithibai College alumni
Male actors from Mumbai
Indian Sikhs
21st-century Indian male actors
Filmfare Awards winners
Screen Awards winners